Blaž Kavčič won the first edition of the tournament by defeating Júlio Silva 6–3, 7–5 in the final.

Seeds

Draw

Finals

Top half

Bottom half

References
 Main Draw
 Qualifying Draw

IS Open de Tenis - Singles
2012 Singles